Adrian of Nicomedia (also known as Hadrian) or Saint Adrian (died 4 March 306) was a Herculian Guard of the Roman Emperor Galerius Maximian. After becoming a convert to Christianity with his wife Natalia (Ναταλία), Adrian was martyred at Nicomedia in Asia-Minor             (Turkey). Hadrian was the chief military saint of Northern Europe for many ages, second only to Saint George, and is much revered in Flanders, Germany and the north of France.

Martyrdom

Adrian and Natalia lived in Nicomedia during the time of Emperor Maximian in the early fourth century. The twenty-eight-year-old Adrian was head of the praetorium.

It is said that while presiding over the torture of a band of Christians, he asked them what reward they expected to receive from God. They replied, "Eye hath not seen, nor ear heard, neither have entered into the heart of man, the things which God hath prepared for them that love him." He was so amazed at their courage that he publicly confessed his faith, though he had not yet been baptized. He was then immediately imprisoned. He was forbidden visitors, but accounts state that his wife Natalia came to visit him, dressed as a boy, to ask for his prayers when he entered Heaven.

After his execution, the executioners wanted to burn the bodies of the dead, but a storm arose and quenched the fire. Natalia recovered one of Adrian's hands.

Historicity
The accuracy of the recorded story has been questioned. A second Hadrian, is said to have been a son of the Emperor Probus, and, having embraced Christianity, to have been put to death (A.D. 320), at Nicomedia in Asia Minor, by the Emperor Licinius. But no reliable information concerning him is extant. He is commemorated on August 26.

Feast day and patronage

In the Eastern Orthodox Church, Saint Adrian shares a feast day with his wife on 8 September; he also has feast days alone on 4 March. In the Roman Catholic Church, he is venerated alone, without his wife, on September 8. The Coptic Orthodox Church likewise venerates St. Adrian and his companions on the third day of the Coptic month known as Nesi (corresponding to September 8), mentioning his wife's role during the Synaxarion reading of that day; spelling in the Coptic Synaxarion (likely a result of translating from Arabic to English) yields the names Andrianus and Anatolia.

Saint Hadrian was the chief military saint of Northern Europe for many ages, second only to Saint George, and is much revered in Flanders, Germany and the north of France. He is usually represented armed, with an anvil in his hands or at his feet.

Sant'Adriano al Foro, a church in the Roman Forum (founded AD 630), was named in his honour. The name was later transferred to Santa Maria della Mercede e Sant'Adriano a Villa Albani (1958) when the old church was demolished.

See also
 Saint Adrian or Hadrian of Nicomedia, patron saint archive

References

Further reading
 
 

Members and leaders of the Praetorian Guard
Saints from Roman Anatolia
Married couples
Converts to Christianity from pagan religions
4th-century Christian martyrs
4th-century Romans
Late Ancient Christian female saints
3rd-century births
306 deaths
Military saints
4th-century Roman women